Kim Chan (December 28, 1917 – October 5, 2008) was a Chinese–American actor and producer.  He was most notable for his roles as Lo Si, a.k.a. The Ancient, in Kung Fu: The Legend Continues and Mr. Kim in The Fifth Element.

Early life
Kim Shung Chan was born in Guangdong, then under the government of the Republic of China. His father was a restaurant owner, and he emigrated to the United States in 1928. An early role that brought him notice was in the Martin Scorsese classic The King of Comedy with Robert De Niro and Jerry Lewis, in which he played Lewis' butler.

Career
He was a familiar veteran character actor in roles that included Chon Wang's (Jackie Chan) father in Shanghai Knights, Fuji in Who's the Man? Saki in High Times' Potluck, Benny Wong in The Corruptor, "Uncle Benny" Chan in Lethal Weapon 4, The Master in Zen Noir, and Mr. Kim in The Fifth Element. He also played the recurring villain "The Eggman" in the cult science fiction series Now and Again, and a cameo waiter in Private Parts. Kim also played the character Lo Si aka: "The Ancient" in 52 episodes of "Kung Fu: The Legend Continues" from 1993 thru 1997. Kung Fu: The Legend Continues was a revised version of the original 1973 classic, Kung Fu with both series starring David Carradine.

In November 1999, Screen Actors Guild presented Chan with an award for lifetime achievement.

Chan received another award for lifetime achievement in August 2004, at the Rhode Island International Film Festival.

In October 2009, a year after his death, Chan appeared on the cover of The Gerontologist.

Filmography

References

External links 
 
 Kim Chan's obituary 
 The Low Rent Kim Chan Fan Club
 
 
  
 

1917 births
2008 deaths
American male film actors
Republic of China (1912–1949) emigrants to the United States
Male actors from Guangdong
Chinese male film actors
20th-century American male actors